Reginald Clancy was a British economist who served as the Finance minister of Indian princely state of Hyderabad from 1918 to 1919. His signature also appeared on the banknotes of the Hyderabadi rupee.

Early life 
He was educated in the United Kingdom, but he worked in India for a major part of his life.

Career

Secretary of State for India 
He also served at the India Office as a member of the Council of the Secretary of State for India.

Hyderabad State 
He served as the finance minister of Hyderabad State.

Hyderabadi rupee 
His signature appeared on the very first issue of the Hyderabadi rupee:

PS261. 1 rupee. ND. (1919) Black on peach underprint. Back light brown.
PS262. 1 rupee. ND. (1919) Bicoloured.
PS264. 10 rupees. FE1327. (1916) Yellow-brown and black on lilac underprint. Series AB.

See also 
 Hyderabadi rupee

References

External links 
 Biography on JSTOR

British economists
Finance ministers